Pomarzany may refer to the following places:
Pomarzany, Greater Poland Voivodeship (west-central Poland)
Pomarzany, Gmina Krośniewice in Łódź Voivodeship (central Poland)
Pomarzany, Gmina Łanięta in Łódź Voivodeship (central Poland)